UFC Fight Night: Saffiedine vs. Lim (also known as UFC Fight Night 34) was a mixed martial arts event held on January 4, 2014, at the Marina Bay Sands in Marina Bay, Singapore.

Background
This event was the first event the UFC held in Singapore. It was the first Fight Night card that wasn't aired on television in the United States market. Instead, the UFC offered fans based in North America, Australia and New Zealand the option to watch it via a new subscription service dubbed "UFC Fight Pass".

The event was expected to be headlined by a welterweight bout between Jake Ellenberger and Tarec Saffiedine. However, in late November, Ellenberger pulled out of the bout citing an injury and was replaced by Lim Hyun-gyu. Lim's original opponent, Kiichi Kunimoto instead faced Luiz Dutra Jr.

Hacran Dias was expected to face Tatsuya Kawajiri at the event.  However, Dias pulled out of the bout citing an injury. Kawajiri instead faced promotional newcomer Sean Soriano.

UFC newcomer Will Chope was originally scheduled to face fellow newcomer Bekbulat Magomedov on this card. However, Magomedov was removed from the card and was replaced by Max Holloway.

Results

Bonus awards
The following fighters were awarded $50,000 bonuses.

 Fight of The Night: Tarec Saffiedine vs. Hyun Gyu Lim
 Knockout of The Night: Max Holloway
 Submission of the Night: Russell Doane

See also
List of UFC events
2014 in UFC

References

UFC Fight Night
2014 in mixed martial arts
Mixed martial arts in Singapore
Sport in Singapore
2014 in Singapore